KTTS-FM (94.7 FM) is a country music formatted radio station, licensed to Springfield, Missouri and the greater Springfield area (market #140). It began broadcasting in 1948, and is one of the oldest FM stations in the United States.

Programming

KTTS places a strong emphasis on news programming. The station hosts a 24-hour news operation, and broadcasts news updates on an hourly basis.

History

KTTS-FM began broadcasting in 1948 on 94.7 MHz as the first FM station in Southwest Missouri. It was established by the Independent Broadcasting Company as a sister station to its AM station, KTTS (now KGMY).

Granville Pearson Ward had been General Manager of KTTS (AM) since its establishment in 1942. He also had extensive earlier experience, and had helped establish Springfield's first radio station, WIAI, licensed to the Heer Stores Co. in the summer of 1922, which broadcast educational programming from Heer's Tower downtown. In 1924 store management shut that station down. Ward purchased its transmitter, and in early 1925 began operating a new station, KFUV, that was licensed to him. KFUV went off the air one year later.

In March 1953, KTTS-TV, a CBS affiliate, was launched as the city's first television station.  During the 1960s the television station was sold and its call letters were changed to KOLR-TV.

The KTTS of today was created by Great Empire Broadcasting in the early 1970s.    KTTS aired more classic-type country, and KTTS-FM aired more modern country. In the late 1980s, KTTS's AM frequency traded frequencies with KGBX, moving KTTS from AM 1400 to AM 1260, which gave them a wider signal range, and gave KGBX the money to buy an FM allotment.

Today, AM 1400 is known as KGMY and owned by Clear Channel. In 1999, the AM 1260 call letters became KTTF, and then a short while later, KSGF, with the KTTS call sign remaining on the FM station.  Today, the format of KSGF is concentrated on news and talk radio.  KSGF and KTTS-FM are still affiliated by the Journal Broadcast Group ownership.

Journal Communications and the E. W. Scripps Company announced on July 30, 2014 that the two companies would merge to create a new broadcast company under the E.W. Scripps Company name that will own the two companies' broadcast properties, including KTTS-FM. The transaction is slated to be completed in 2015, pending shareholder and regulatory approvals. Scripps exited radio in 2018; the Springfield stations went to SummitMedia in a four-market, $47 million deal completed on November 1, 2018.

Former on-air staff
Bob Barker, star of the TV show The Price Is Right, got his first job in media with KTTS in the 1940s.

References

External links

FCC History cards for KTTS-FM (covering 1948-1980)

Country radio stations in the United States
TTS-FM
Radio stations established in 1948
1948 establishments in Missouri